Totally Accurate Battle Simulator (TABS) is a ragdoll physics battle simulation fighting video game developed and published by Landfall Games. It is a parody of the battle simulator genre. An alpha version of the game was initially released in 2016 to a small audience. The game was released in early access on Steam on 1 April 2019, for Microsoft Windows and macOS, and in December 2019 for Xbox One. It has since received numerous free title updates that have added new content, such as maps and units, in addition to fixing bugs and improving the performance. The game was released in full on 1 April 2021 for Microsoft Windows and macOS and on 5 October 2021 for Xbox players. A Nintendo Switch port was released in November 2022. Versions for Android and iOS are currently in development.

Gameplay 
Totally Accurate Battle Simulator is a ragdoll physics battle simulator. The game encompasses two main modes: Campaign and Sandbox. In the former, players are given a limited amount of in-game money to build an army in order to defeat an enemy force. In the latter, there is no monetary limit and players build both armies. The two opposing armies can be placed on either opposite sides of the map, or one can surround the other. As soon as the player clicks "Start", the battle begins and the two armies rush forward to attack each other. Once either army has been defeated, the battle freezes and the player is informed of who the victor is. While armies typically win by defeating all enemy units, a May 2020 update added new winning conditions, such as surviving for a given amount of time, or killing a specific enemy unit. During ongoing battles, players can move the camera around the map to get a better view of the fight, and can slow down or freeze time themselves. With the addition of a May 2019 update, players are also able to "possess" units—controlling them manually from a third- or first-person perspective.

The game has over 130 units across fourteen factions, which are mostly themed around different cultures and eras of human history. Some of these units are hidden on various maps and must be found by the player before they are unlocked. Many units have special abilities that are unique to them or they share with a few others, such as flight, projectile deflection, and teleportation. The maps in the game are centered around the same themes as the factions and differ in size and geography. The game features twenty maps in total, with twenty-two additional "Simulation" maps.

Players can create their own battle scenarios, choosing from any of the available units, maps, and winning conditions. A December 2020 update added the Unit Creator, where players can create their own units, giving them abilities, clothing, and weapons from the already existing TABS units, as well as the spin-offs Totally Accurate Battlegrounds and Totally Accurate Battle Zombielator. Both custom battles and units can be shared with other players via the in-game workshop. The full release of the game in April 2021 added both online and local multiplayer modes, and achievements. a new update in November 3rd 2021 added the map creator.

Development 
The game was made during a week-long game jam in a Swedish castle. The game was developed using the Unity game engine. Landfall Games released the download for people who signed up to their website in July 2016. The game was released in open alpha in November 2016, while the closed alpha was released in December 2016. The full version of the game was released in early access on Steam on 1 April 2019 for Microsoft Windows and macOS.

On 9 June 2019 at the E3 convention, Xbox announced via their Indie Developers program that TABS would be coming to Xbox One in the Xbox Game Pass later that year. It was released via Xbox Game Preview on December 20, 2019. On 1 April 2020, free downloadable content (DLC) for the game, entitled the Bug DLC, was released; for a limited time, players could buy the DLC, with half the money raised being donated to Doctors Without Borders.

The game exited early access for Windows and Mac on 1 April 2021. The Xbox One version was released in full on October 5, 2021. A Nintendo Switch port of the game is slated for launch in Q3 2022. A port for iOS and Android is currently being developed by Landfall Games in collaboration with XD.

Reception 
The game received generally positive reviews. It has been referred to as a "vibrant and goofy take on chaotic combat", and its "silly graphics and kind of wonky body physics" were told to be part of the "charming appeal of an otherwise realistic simulator". The game has also been described as "brilliant in its simplicity" and "outstanding".

Spin-offs
Two spin-offs, Totally Accurate Battle Zombielator, which is a parody of the survival horror genre, and Totally Accurate Battlegrounds, a parody of the battle royale genre, were released on 1 April 2017 and 5 June 2018, respectively.

References

External links 
 

2021 video games
Multiplayer and single-player video games
Nintendo Switch games
Parody video games
Satirical video games
Simulation video games
Swedish satire
Video game spin-offs
Video games developed in Sweden
Windows games
Xbox Cloud Gaming games
Xbox One games